La Fouly is a village in Val Ferret in the Swiss canton of Valais. At an altitude of 1,600 metres, it is part of the municipality of Orsières (900 m). It sits at the foot of Mont Dolent (3,823 m) and the Tour Noir (3,836m) in the Mont Blanc massif.

La Fouly is a starting point for many hikes into the surrounding mountains and is also a small ski resort. It is also often used as a stopping place for the Tour du Mont Blanc, and is a stage of the Ultra-Trail du Mont-Blanc.

External links
La Fouly myswitzerland.com

Villages in Valais
Ski areas and resorts in Switzerland